The Malaysia national under-16 football team (also known as Malaysia Under-16 or Malaysia U-16) represents Malaysia in international football competitions in AFF U-16 Championship, AFC U-16 Championship and FIFA U-17 World Cup, as well as any other under-17 international football tournaments. The players in the current team mainly consist of players with age within 15 to 16 years old where the oldest players will be below the age requirement of 17 years old when the next U-17 tournament started.

History 
The team is considered to be the feeder team for the Malaysia national under-19 football team. It is for players aged 16 and less. Also in existence are national teams for Under-22s (Under-21s and Under-20s), Under-19s and Under-15s. As long as they are eligible, players can play at any level, hence it is possible for one to play for the U-16s, senior side and then again for the U-16s.

AFF U-16 Youth Championship 
The team best performance in the AFF U-16 Youth Championship is by winning the 2013 edition in Myanmar.

Players was called up for international duty with the international selection as the team will represent the nation in the 2016 AFF U-16 Youth Championship in July 2016. The team did not managed to pass the group stage.

AFC U-16 Championship qualifying 
Malaysia achieved their best ever quarter-final appearance in 2014 edition before being eliminated by Australia after a narrow 1–2 defeat.
The team continued to show their improvement at youth level by advancing to the 2016 competition with three wins from four during their qualifying campaign under the guidance of coach P.Somasundram. The team targeting for reaching the semi-finals and qualify for the World Cup.

The team will participated for the 2016 edition in Group C alongside South Korea, Oman, and Iraq. They face the 2016 campaign with failed to get past the group stage, defeated twice each with Oman 0–3 and South Korea 0–3 and draw 1–1 with Iraq in the group, closing their chances to qualify to the 2017 FIFA U-17 World Cup

FIFA U-17 World Cup qualifying 
The team qualifying will be determined after AFC U-16 Youth Championship 2018 result.

NFDP collaboration 
After a recent slump in performance of national team, Football Association of Malaysia (FAM) and National Football Development Programme (NFDP) has collaborated to increase the quality of grassroots football development in Malaysia in order to produce better players for the national team. The current target is to produce players which will represent Malaysia in Under 17 World Cup competition in near future.

International records

World Cup

FIFA U-17 World Cup

Asian Confederation

AFC U-17 Asian Cup

ASEAN Confederation

AFF U17 Youth Championship

AFF U-16 Youth Championship

Invited tournaments

Results and fixtures

2022

Players

Current squad 
The following 23 players were called up for the 2019 AFF U-16 Youth Championship.

Head Coach: Osmera Omaro

Previous call up 
The following players have also been called up this year (2017).

Coaching staff

Honours

Regional 
 AFF U-16 Youth Championship
  Champions (2): 2013, 2019
  Third Place (2): 2008, 2018

Coaching History 
  S. Balachandran (2013–2014)
  Somasundram a/l Periasamy (2015–2016)
  Lim Teong Kim (2017–2018)
  P. Maniam (2019)
  Osmera Omaro (2022–present)

See also 
 Malaysia national football team
 Malaysia women's national football team
 Malaysia national under-23 football team
 Malaysia national under-22 football team
 Malaysia national under-19 football team

Notes

References

External links 
 Harimau Malaysia (National Team)
 FIFA profile: Malaysia / Fixtures & Results
 Football Association of Malaysia

Asian national under-17 association football teams
U-16